Lank may refer to:
 Lank (surname)
 Lank, Cornwall, a hamlet in Cornwall, United Kingdom
 Lank Rigg, fell in the English Lake District

See also
 Lanc (disambiguation)